Lars "Leari" Ljungberg, (born 6 March 1977 in Huddinge, Sweden) is a Swedish musician and bass player of the alternative rock/glam rock band The Ark.

He started out as a studio and touring musician for artists such as soul singer Titiyo. In 1999 he went on an 8-month tour with the Cardigans due to Magnus Sveningsson, Cardigans regular bass player being injured. 
 In autumn and winter 08/09 Leari was employed as a bassist in the rock opera Jesus Christ Superstar at the Malmö opera.
He is also a member of The Ark side-project, the disco/glam rock crossover band Stereo Explosion.

Personal life
Ljungberg was born just outside Stockholm, Sweden and grew up in Saudi Arabia, South Korea and Växjö, Sweden.

His mother is Egyptian of Beja/Nubian descent and father is Swedish.

References

External links
 
 Video of song "The worrying kind"

1977 births
Eurovision Song Contest entrants for Sweden
Eurovision Song Contest entrants of 2007
Swedish people of Egyptian descent
Living people
The Ark (Swedish band) members
Melodifestivalen contestants of 2007
Melodifestivalen contestants of 2006